Sayyid Jafar al-Hakim (born 1965) is a high-ranking Shiite Ayatollah in Najaf, Iraq.

Biography

Family Tree

Sayyid Jafar al-Hakim is a member of the well known and highly respected Hakim Family of Shiite scholars.

Early life

Sayyid Jafar al-Hakim was born in Najaf, the son of Ayatollah Sayyid Abdul al-Sahib, and the grandson of the Grand Ayatollah Sayyid Muhsin al-Hakim, the latter is considered one of the greatest Shi'ite scholars of the 20th century. Besides his studies in secular schools, he joined the Islamic Seminary at an early age in 1977.

Sayyid Jafar al-Hakim is brother to Sayyid Ali al-Hakim.

Ba'ath Party

He continued his studies while imprisoned by Saddam Ba'ath party for more than nine years. The studies, at that period of time, were under the supervision of a number of Shiite scholars and jurists who were in prison with him.

On February 13, 1991 through a daring attempt, he managed to escape from the prison of Saddam, following the Gulf War air strikes on Iraq, and joined the Islamic seminary in another country.

Role in Contemporary Iraq

After the fall of Saddam in 2003, he returned to Iraq to continue his religious academic career, teaching at the Advanced Intermediate Studies (Sutooh Olya) level, and he now supervises research sessions of Advanced Seminars (Bahth Kharij) level in jurisprudence and principles of jurisprudence. Besides teaching and supervising in other fields of sciences such as, theology, theosophy, philosophy, and epistemology.

Conferences

 For three years, he had held a seminar for intellectuals, where he addressed many educational, social, and political theories.
 He is a lecturer, speaking on issues of religion and contemporary thought. He has participated in many seminars and conferences, both on the local and international level, and has supervised weekly symposia for long periods outside of Iraq, and in Baghdad and Najaf.
 He has visited the United States previously and delivered lectures on a variety of topics. 
 He has visited the Hakim Foundation in the United States, which is run by family member Ammar al-Hakim.

Works

Scholarly Articles
 Justice for the Poor
 Controversies between the Intellectual and the Jurist
 Interfaith Dialogue
 Religious Pluralism
 Resistance and Terrorism
 Differences of Capabilities
 Contemporary Problems in Religion
 Objectivity and Moderation

Religious Theses
 Treatise on Monotheism
 Treatise on Imamate (Leadership)
 Treatise on Religion and the Religious Project
 Treatise on Shia Society and Culture

Advanced Dissertations and Research
 Dissertation in Advanced Seminars (Bahth Kharij) in the science of Principles of Jurisprudence for Grand Ayatollah Sheikh Wahid al-Khorasani
 Complete discussions in Advanced Seminars (Bahth Kharij)) in the sciences of Jurisprudence for Ayatollah Sheikh Muhammad Sanad (full course)
 Dissertation of two Jurisprudential studies with Sheikh Muhammad Sanad, on “Ownership in Institutional States” and on “Religious Rituals”
 Philosophical Psychology, dissertation with Ayatollah Sheikh Fayadhi
 The Primacy of Existence, dissertation with Ayatollah Sheikh Fayadhi
 Philosophical Dialogues, between him and his teacher Ayatollah Sheikh Fayadhi
 Research in perceptions in “The New Science of Theology,” a series of studies.

See also
List of marjas

References

1960 births
Living people
People from Najaf
Iraqi ayatollahs
Islamic democracy activists